The Wang Jingwei regime or the Wang Ching-wei regime is the common name of the Reorganized National Government of the Republic of China, the government of the puppet state of the Empire of Japan in eastern China called simply the Republic of China. This should not be confused with the contemporaneously existing National Government of the Republic of China under Chiang Kai-shek, which was fighting with the Allies of World War II against Japan during this period. The country was ruled as a dictatorship under Wang Jingwei, a very high-ranking former Kuomintang (KMT) official. The region that it would administer was initially seized by Japan throughout the late 1930s with the beginning of the Second Sino-Japanese War. 

Wang, a rival of Chiang Kai-shek and member of the pro-peace faction of the KMT, defected to the Japanese side and formed a collaborationist rebel government in occupied Nanking (Nanjing) (the traditional capital of China) in 1940. The new state claimed the entirety of China (outside the Japanese puppet state of Manchukuo) during its existence, portraying itself as the legitimate inheritors of the Xinhai Revolution and Sun Yat-sen's legacy as opposed to Chiang Kai-shek's government in Chunking (Chongqing), but effectively only Japanese-occupied territory was under its direct control. Its international recognition was limited to other members of the Anti-Comintern Pact, of which it was a signatory. The Reorganized National Government existed until the end of World War II and the surrender of Japan in August 1945, at which point the regime was dissolved and many of its leading members were executed for treason.

The state was formed by combining the previous Reformed Government (1938–1940) and Provisional Government (1937–1940) of the Republic of China, puppet regimes which ruled the central and northern regions of China that were under Japanese control, respectively. Unlike Wang Jingwei's government, these regimes were not much more than arms of the Japanese military leadership and received no recognition even from Japan itself or its allies. However, after 1940 the former territory of the Provisional Government remained semi-autonomous from Nanjing's control, under the name "North China Political Council". The region of Mengjiang (puppet government in Inner Mongolia) was under Wang Jingwei's government only nominally. His regime was also hampered by the fact that the powers granted to it by the Japanese were extremely limited, and this was only partly changed with the signing of a new treaty in 1943 which gave it more sovereignty from Japanese control. The Japanese largely viewed it as not an end in itself but the means to an end, a bridge for negotiations with Chiang Kai-shek, which led them to often treat Wang with indifference.

Names
The regime is informally also known as the Nanjing Nationalist Government, the Nanjing Regime, or by its leader Wang Jingwei Regime. As the government of the Republic of China and subsequently of the People's Republic of China regard the regime as illegal, it is also commonly known as Wang's Puppet Regime or Puppet Nationalist Government in Greater China. Other names used are the Republic of China-Nanjing, China-Nanjing, or New China.

Background 
While Wang Jingwei was widely regarded as a favorite to inherit Sun Yat-sen's position as leader of the Nationalist Party, based upon his faithful service to the party throughout the 1910s and 20s and based on his unique position as the one who accepted and recorded Dr. Sun's last will and testament, he was rapidly overtaken by Chiang Kai-shek.  By the 1930s, Wang Jingwei had taken the position of Minister of Foreign Affairs for the Nationalist Government under Chiang Kai-shek.  This put him in control over the deteriorating Sino-Japanese relationship.  While Chiang Kai-shek focused his primary attentions against the Chinese Communist Party, Wang Jingwei diligently toiled to preserve the peace between China and Japan, repeatedly stressing the need for a period of extended peace in order for China to elevate itself economically and militarily to the levels of its neighbor and the other Great powers of the world.  Despite his efforts, Wang was unable to find a peaceful solution to prevent the Japanese from commencing an invasion into Chinese territory.

By April 1938, the national conference of the KMT, held in retreat at the temporary capital of Chongqing, appointed Wang as vice-president of the party, reporting only to Chiang Kai-shek himself. Meanwhile, the Japanese advance into Chinese territory as part of the Second Sino-Japanese War continued unrelentingly.  From his new position, Wang urged Chiang Kai-shek to pursue a peace agreement with Japan on the sole condition that the hypothetical deal "did not interfere with the territorial integrity of China". Chiang Kai-shek was adamant, however, that he would countenance no surrender, and that it was his position that, were China to be united completely under his control, the Japanese could readily be repulsed. As a result, Chiang continued to devote his primary attention to eradicating the Communists and ending the Chinese Civil War. On December 18, 1938, Wang Jingwei and several of his closest supporters resigned from their positions and boarded a plane to Hanoi in order to seek alternative means of ending the war.

From this new base, Wang began pursuit of a peaceful resolution to the conflict independent of the Nationalist Party in exile. In June 1939, Wang and his supporters began negotiating with the Japanese for the creation of a new Nationalist Government which could end the war despite Chiang's objections. To this end, Wang sought to discredit the Nationalists in Chongqing on the basis that they represented not the republican government envisioned by Dr. Sun, but rather a "one-party dictatorship", and subsequently call together a Central Political Conference back to the capital of Nanjing in order to formally transfer control over the party away from Chiang Kai-shek. These efforts were stymied by Japanese refusal to offer backing for Wang and his new government. Ultimately, Wang Jingwei and his allies would establish their almost entirely powerless new party and government in Nanjing in 1940, in the hope that Tokyo might eventually be willing to negotiate a deal for peace, which, though painful, might allow China to survive.

Wang and his group were also damaged early on by the defection of the diplomat Gao Zongwu, who played a critical role in arranging Wang's defection after two years of negotiations with the Japanese, in January 1940. He had become disillusioned and believed that Japan did not see China as an equal partner, taking with him the documents of the Basic Treaty that Japan had signed with the Wang Jingwei government. He revealed them to the Kuomintang press, becoming a major propaganda coup for Chiang Kai-shek and discrediting Wang's movement in the eyes of the public as mere puppets of the Japanese.

Political boundaries

In theory, the Reorganized National Government controlled all of China with the exception of Manchukuo, which it recognized as an independent state. In actuality, at the time of its formation, the Reorganized Government controlled only Jiangsu, Anhui, and the north sector of Zhejiang, all being Japanese-controlled territories after 1937.

Thereafter, the Reorganized Government's actual borders waxed and waned as the Japanese gained or lost territory during the course of the war. During the December 1941 Japanese offensive the Reorganized Government extended its control over Hunan, Hubei, and parts of Jiangxi provinces. The port of Shanghai and the cities of Hankou and Wuchang were also placed under control of the Reformed Government after 1940.

The Japanese-controlled provinces of Shandong and Hebei were de jure part of this political entity, though they were de facto under military administration of the Japanese Northern China Area Army from its headquarters in Beijing. Likewise, the Japanese-controlled territories in central China were under military administration of the Japanese Sixth Area Army from its headquarters in Hankou (Wuhan). Other Japanese-controlled territories had military administrations directly reporting to the Japanese military headquarters in Nanjing, with the exception of Guangdong and Guangxi which briefly had its headquarters in Canton. The central and southern zones of military occupation were eventually linked together after Operation Ichi-Go in 1944, though the Japanese garrison had no effective control over most of this region apart from a narrow strip around the Guangzhou–Hankou railway.

The Reorganized Government's control was mostly limited to:
 Jiangsu: ; capital: Zhenjiang (also included the national capital of Nanking (Nanjing))
 Anhui: ; capital: Anqing 
 Zhejiang: ; capital: Hangzhou

According to other sources, total extension of territory during 1940 period was 1,264,000 km2.

In 1940 an agreement was signed between the Inner Mongolian puppet state of Mengjiang and the Nanjing regime, incorporating the former into the latter as an autonomous part.

History

Shanghai as de facto capital, 1939–1941 
With Nanjing still rebuilding itself after the devastating assault and occupation by the Japanese Imperial Army, the fledgling Reorganized Nationalist Government turned to Shanghai as its primary focal point. With its key role as both an economic and media center for all China, close affiliation to Western Imperial powers even despite the Japanese invasion, and relatively sheltered position from attacks by KMT and Communist forces alike, Shanghai offered both sanctuary and opportunity for Wang and his allies' ambitions. Once in Shanghai, the new regime quickly moved to take control over those publications already supportive of Wang and his peace platform, while also engaging in violent, gang-style attacks against rival news outlets. By November 1940, the Reorganized Nationalist Party had secured enough local support to begin hostile takeovers of both Chinese courts and banks still under nominal control by the KMT in Chongqing or Western powers. Buoyed by this rapid influx of seized collateral, the Reorganized Government under its recently appoint Finance Minister, Zhou Fohai, was able to issue a new currency for circulation. Ultimately however, the already limited economic influence garnered by the new banknotes was further diminished by Japanese efforts to contain the influence of the new regime, at least for a time, to territories firmly under Japanese control like Shanghai and other isolated regions of the Yangtze Valley.

Foundation of the Reorganized Government in Nanjing

The administrative structure of the Reorganized National Government included a Legislative Yuan and an Executive Yuan. Both were under the president and head of state Wang Jingwei. However, actual political power remained with the commander of the Japanese Central China Area Army and Japanese political entities formed by Japanese political advisors.

After obtaining Japanese approval to establish a national government in the summer of 1940, Wang Jingwei ordered the 6th National Congress of the Kuomintang to establish this government in Nanjing. The dedication occurred in the Conference Hall, and both the "blue-sky white-sun red-earth" national flag and the "blue-sky white-sun" Kuomintang flag were unveiled, flanking a large portrait of Sun Yat-sen.

On the day the new government was formed, and just before the session of the "Central Political Conference" began, Wang visited Sun's tomb in Nanjing's Purple Mountain to establish the legitimacy of his power as Sun's successor. Wang had been a high-level official of the Kuomintang government and, as a confidant to Sun, had transcribed Sun's last will, the Zongli's Testament. To discredit the legitimacy of the Chongqing government, Wang adopted Sun's flag in the hope that it would establish him as the rightful successor to Sun and bring the government back to Nanjing.

A principal goal of the new regime was to portray itself as the legitimate continuation of the former Nationalist government, despite the Japanese occupation. To this end, the Reorganized government frequently sought to revitalize and expand the former policies of the Nationalist government, often to mixed success.

Efforts to expand Japanese recognition 

While Wang had been successful in securing from Japan a "basic treaty" recognizing the foundation of his new party in November 1940, the produced document granted the Reorganized Nationalist Government almost no powers whatsoever. This initial treaty precluded any possibility for Wang to act as intermediary with Chiang Kai-shek and his forces in securing a peace agreement in China. Likewise, the regime was afforded no extra administrative powers in occupied China, save those few previously carved out in Shanghai. Indeed, official Japanese correspondence regarded the Nanjing regime as trivially important, and urged any and all token representatives stationed with Wang and his allies to dismiss all diplomatic efforts by the new government which could not directly contribute to a total military victory over Chiang and his forces. Hoping to expand the treaty in such a way as to be useful, Wang formally traveled to Tokyo in June 1941 in order to meet with prime minister Fumimaro Konoe and his cabinet to discuss new terms and agreements. Unfortunately for Wang, his visit coincided with the Nazi invasion of the Soviet Union, a move which further emboldened officials in Tokyo to pursue total victory in China, rather than accept a peace deal. In the end, Konoe eventually agreed to provide a substantial loan to the Nanjing government as well as increased sovereignty; neither of which came to fruition, and indeed, neither of which were even mentioned to military commanders stationed in China. As a slight conciliation, Wang was successful in persuading the Japanese to secure official recognition for the Nanjing Government from the other Axis Powers.

Breakthrough, 1943 

As the Japanese offensive stalled around the Pacific, conditions remained generally consistent under Wang Jingwei's government. The regime continued to represent itself as the legitimate government of China, continued to appeal to Chiang Kai-shek to seek a peace deal, and continued to chafe under the extremely limited sovereignty afforded by the Japanese occupiers. Yet by 1943, Japanese leaders including Hideki Tojo, recognizing that the tide of war was turning against them, sought new ways to reinforce the thinly stretched Japanese forces. To this end, Tokyo finally found it expedient to fully recognize Wang Jingwei's government as a full ally, and a replacement Pact of Alliance was drafted for the basic treaty. This new agreement granted the Nanjing government markedly enhanced administrative control over its own territory, as well as increased ability to make limited self-decisions. Despite this windfall, the deal came far too late for the Reorganized government to have sufficient resources to take advantage of its new powers, and Japan was in no condition to offer aid to its new partner.

War on Opium 
As a result of general chaos and wartime various profiteering efforts of the conquering Japanese armies, already considerable illegal opium smuggling operations expanded greatly in the Reorganized Nation Government's territory. Indeed, Japanese forces themselves became arguably the largest and most widespread traffickers within the territory under the auspices of semi-official narcotics monopolies. While initially too politically weak to make inroads into the Japanese operations, as the war began to turn against them, the Japanese government sought to incorporate some collaborationist governments more actively into the war effort. To this end in October 1943 the Japanese government signed a treaty with the Reorganized Nationalist Government of China offering them a greater degree of control over their own territory. As a result, Wang Jingwei and his government were able to gain some increased control over the opium monopolies. Negotiations by Chen Gongbo were successful in reaching an agreement to cut opium imports from Mongolia in half, as well as an official turnover of state-sponsored monopolies from Japan over to the Reorganized Nationalist Government. Yet, perhaps due to financial concerns, the regime sought only limited reductions in the distribution of opium throughout the remainder of the war.

The Nanjing Government and the northern Chinese areas

The Beijing administration (East Yi Anti-Communist Autonomous Administration) was under the commander-in-chief of the Japanese Northern China Area Army until the Yellow River area fell inside the sphere of influence of the Japanese Central China Area Army. During this same period the area from middle Zhejiang to Guangdong was administered by the Japanese North China Area Army. These small, largely independent fiefdoms had local money and local leaders, and frequently squabbled.

Wang Jingwei traveled to Tokyo in 1941 for meetings. In Tokyo the Reorganized National Government Vice President Zhou Fohai commented to the Asahi Shimbun newspaper that the Japanese establishment was making little progress in the Nanjing area. This quote provoked anger from Kumataro Honda, the Japanese ambassador in Nanjing. Zhou Fohai petitioned for total control of China's central provinces by the Reorganized National Government. In response, Imperial Japanese Army Lt. Gen. Teiichi Suzuki was ordered to provide military guidance to the Reorganized National Government, and so became part of the real power that lay behind Wang's rule.

With the permission of the Japanese Army, a monopolistic economic policy was applied, to the benefit of Japanese zaibatsu and local representatives. Though these companies were supposedly treated the same as local Chinese companies by the government, the president of the Yuan legislature in Nanjing, Chen Gongbo, complained that this was untrue to the Kaizō Japanese review. The Reorganized National Government of the Republic of China also featured its own embassy in Yokohama, Japan (as did Manchukuo).

Government and politics

International recognition and foreign relations 

The Nanjing Nationalist Government received little international recognition as it was seen as a Japanese puppet state, being recognized only by Japan and the rest of the Axis powers. Initially, its main sponsor, Japan, hoped to come to a peace accord with Chiang Kai-shek and held off official diplomatic recognition for the Wang Jingwei regime for eight months after its founding, not establishing formal diplomatic relations with the National Reorganized Government until 30 November 1940. The Sino-Japanese Basic Treaty was signed on 20 November 1940, by which Japan recognised the Nationalist Government, and it also included a Japan–Manchukuo–China joint declaration by which China recognized the Empire of Great Manchuria and the three countries pledged to create a "New Order in East Asia." The United States and Britain immediately denounced the formation of the government, seeing it as a tool of Japanese imperialism. In July 1941, after negotiations by Foreign Minister Chu Minyi, the Nanjing Government was recognized as the government of China by Germany and Italy. Soon after, Spain, Slovakia, Romania, Bulgaria, Croatia, and Denmark also recognized and established relations with the Wang Jingwei regime as the government of China. China under the Reorganized National Government also became a signatory of the Anti-Comintern Pact on 25 November 1941.

After Japan established diplomatic relations with the Holy See in 1942, they and their ally Italy pressured Pope Pius XII to recognize the Nanjing regime and allow a Chinese envoy to be appointed to the Vatican, but he refused to give in to these pressures. Instead the Vatican came to an informal agreement with Japan that their apostolic delegate in Beijing would pay visits to Catholics in the Nanjing government's territory. The Pope also ignored the suggestion of the aforementioned apostolic delegate, Mario Zanin, who recommended in October 1941 that the Vatican recognize the Wang Jingwei regime as the legitimate government of China. Zanin would remain in the Wang Jingwei regime's territory as apostolic delegate while another bishop in Chongqing was to represent Catholic interests in Chiang Kai-shek's territory. Vichy France, despite being aligned with the Axis, resisted Japanese pressure and also refused to recognize the Wang Jingwei regime, with French diplomats in China remaining accredited to the government of Chiang Kai-shek.

The Reorganized National Government had its own Foreign Section or Ministry of Foreign Affairs for managing international relations, although it was short on personnel.

On 9 January 1943, the Reorganized National Government signed the "Treaty on Returning Leased Territories and Repealing Extraterritoriality Rights" with Japan, which abolished all foreign concessions within occupied China. Reportedly the date was originally to have been later that month, but was moved to January 9 to be before the United States concluded a similar treaty with Chiang Kai-shek's government. The Nanjing Government then took control of all of the international concessions in Shanghai and its other territories. Later that year Wang Jingwei attended the Greater East Asia Conference as the Chinese representative.

The Wang Jingwei government sent Chinese athletes, including the national football team, to compete in the 1940 East Asian Games, which were held in Tokyo for the 2,600th anniversary of the legendary founding of the Japanese Empire by Emperor Jimmu, and were a replacement for the cancelled 1940 Summer Olympics.

State ideology 
After Japan's pivot towards joining the Axis powers (which included signing the Tripartite Pact), Wang Jingwei's government promoted the idea of pan-Asianism directed against the West, aimed at establishing a "New Order in East Asia" together with Japan, Manchukuo, and other Asian nations that would expel Western colonial powers from Asia, particularly the "Anglo-Saxons" (the U.S. and Britain) that dominated large parts of Asia. Wang Jingwei used pan-Asianism, basing his views on Sun Yat-sen's advocacy for Asian people to unite against the West in the early 20th century, partly to justify his efforts at working together with Japan. He claimed it was natural for Japan and China to have good relations and cooperation because of their close affinity, describing their conflicts as a temporary aberration in both nation's history. Furthermore, the government believed in the unity of all Asian nations with Japan as their leader as the only way to achieve their goals of removing Western colonial powers from Asia. There was no official description of which Asian peoples were considered to be included in this, but Wang, members of the Propaganda Ministry, and other officials of his regime writing for collaborationist media had different interpretations, at times listing Japan, China, Manchukuo, Thailand, the Philippines, Burma, Nepal, India, Afghanistan, Iran, Iraq, Syria, and Arabia as potential members of an "East Asian League."

From 1940 onwards, the Wang Jingwei government depicted World War II as a struggle by Asians against the West, more specifically the Anglo-American powers. The Reorganized National Government had a Propaganda Ministry, which exerted control over local media outlets and used them to disseminate pan-Asianist and anti-Western propaganda. British and American diplomats in Shanghai and Nanjing noted by 1940 that the Wang Jingwei-controlled press was publishing anti-Western content. These campaigns were aided by the Japanese authorities in China and also reflected pan-Asian thought as promoted by Japanese thinkers, which intensified after the start of the Pacific War in December 1941. Pro-regime newspapers and journals published articles which cited instances of racial discrimination towards immigrant Asian communities living in the West and Western colonies in Asia. Chu Minyi, the minister of foreign affairs of the Nanjing Government, asserted in an article written shortly after the attack on Pearl Harbor that the Sino-Japanese conflict and other wars among Asians were the result of secret manipulation by the Western powers. Lin Baisheng, the minister of propaganda from 1940 to 1944, also made these claims in several of his speeches.

Since Japan was aligned with Germany, Italy, and other European Axis countries, the Nanjing Government's propaganda did not portray the conflict as a war against all white people and focused on the U.S. and Britain in particular. Their newspapers like Republican Daily praised the German people as a great race for their technological and organizational advancements and glorified the Nazi regime for supposedly transforming Germany into a great power over the past decade. The publications of the Nanjing Government also agreed with the anti-Jewish views held by Nazi Germany, with Wang Jingwei and other officials seeing Jews as dominating the American government and being conspirators with the Anglo-American powers to control the world.

The government also took measures to ban the spread of Anglo-American culture and lifestyle among Chinese people in its territory and promoted traditional Confucian culture. Generally it considered Eastern spiritual culture to be superior to the Western culture of materialism, individualism, and liberalism. Christian missionary schools and missionary activities were banned, the study of English language in schools was reduced, and the usage of English in the postal and customs system was gradually reduced as well. Vice minister of education Tai Yingfu called for a campaign against the Anglo-American nations in education. Zhou Huaren, vice minister of propaganda, blamed Chinese students that studied in the West for spreading Western values among the population and disparaging traditional Chinese culture. Wang Jingwei blamed communism, anarchism, and internationalism (which Wang considered Anglo-American thinking) for making other peoples despise their own culture and embracing the Anglo-American culture. He believed it was necessary to promote Confucianism to oppose Anglo-American "cultural aggression." At the same time, Zhou Huaren and others also thought that it was necessary to adopt Western scientific advancements while combining them with traditional Eastern culture to develop themselves, as he said Japan did in the Meiji Restoration, seeing that as a model for others to follow.

National defense 

During its existence, the Reorganized National Government nominally led a large army that was estimated to have included 300,000 to 500,000 men, along with a smaller navy and air force. Although its land forces possessed limited armor and artillery, they were primarily an infantry force. Military aid from Japan was also very limited despite Japanese promises to assist the Nanjing regime in the "Japan–China Military Affairs Agreement" that they signed. All military matters were the responsibility of the Central Military Commission, but in practice that body was mainly a ceremonial one. In reality, many of the army's commanders operated outside of the direct command of the central government in Nanjing. The majority of its officers were either former National Revolutionary Army personnel or warlord officers from the early Republican era. Thus their reliability and combat capability was questionable, and Wang Jingwei was estimated to only be able to count on the loyalty of about 10% to 15% of his nominal forces. Among the reorganized government's best units were three Capital Guards divisions based in Nanjing, Zhou Fohai's Taxation Police Corps, and the 1st Front Army of Ren Yuandao.

The majority of the government's forces were armed with a mix of captured Nationalist weaponry and a small amount of Japanese equipment, the latter mainly being given to Nanjing's best units. The lack of local military industry for the duration of the war meant that the Nanjing regime had trouble arming its troops. While the army was mainly an infantry force, in 1941 it did receive 18 Type 94 tankettes for a token armored force, and reportedly they also received 20 armored cars and 24 motorcycles. The main type of artillery in use were medium mortars, but they also possessed 31 field guns (which included Model 1917 mountain guns)—mainly used by the Guards divisions. Oftentimes, the troops were equipped with the German Stahlhelm, which were used in large quantities by the Chinese Nationalist Army. For small arms, there was no standard rifle and a large variety of different weapons were used, which made supplying them with ammunition difficult. The most common rifles in use was the Chinese version of the Mauser 98k and the Hanyang 88, while other notable weapons included Chinese copies of the Czechoslovakian ZB-26 machine guns.

Along with the great variation in equipment, there was also a disparity in sizes of units. Some "armies" had only a few thousand troops while some "divisions" several thousand. There was a standard divisional structure, but only the elite Guards divisions closer to the capital actually had anything resembling it. In addition to these regular army forces, there were multiple police and local militia, which numbered in the tens of thousands, but were deemed to be completely unreliable by the Japanese. Most of the units located around Beijing in northern China remained, in effect, under the authority of the North China Political Council rather than that of the central government. In an attempt to improve the quality of the officer corps, multiple military academies had been opened, including a Central Military Academy in Nanjing and a Naval Academy in Shanghai. In addition there was a military academy in Beijing for the North China Political Council's forces, and a branch of the central academy in Canton.

A small navy was established with naval bases at Weihaiwei and Qingdao, but it mostly consisted of small patrol boats that were used for coastal and river defense. Reportedly, the captured Nationalist cruisers Ning Hai and Ping Hai were handed over to the government by the Japanese, becoming important propaganda tools. However, the Imperial Japanese Navy took them back in 1943 for its own use. In addition there were two regiments of marines, one at Canton and the other at Weihaiwei. By 1944, the navy was under direct command of Ren Yuandao, the naval minister. An Air Force of the Reorganized National Government was established in May 1941 with the opening of the Aviation School and receiving three aircraft, Tachikawa Ki-9 trainers. In the future the air force received additional Ki-9 and Ki-55 trainers as well as multiple transports. Plans by Wang Jingwei to form a fighter squadron with Nakajima Ki-27s did not come to fruition as the Japanese did not trust the pilots enough to give them combat aircraft. Morale was low and a number of defections took place. The only two offensive aircraft they did possess were Tupolev SB bombers which were flown by defecting Nationalist crews.

The Reorganized National Government's army was primarily tasked with garrison and police duties in the occupied territories. It also took part in anti-partisan operations against Communist guerrillas, such as in the Hundred Regiments Offensive, or played supporting roles for the Imperial Japanese Army (IJA). The Nanjing Government undertook a "rural pacification" campaign to eradicate communists from the countryside, arresting and executing many people suspected of being communists, with support from the Japanese.

Japanese methods of recruiting 
During the conflicts in central China, the Japanese utilized several methods to recruit Chinese volunteers. Japanese sympathisers including Nanjing's pro-Japanese governor, or major local landowners such as Ni Daolang, were used to recruit local peasants in return for money or food. The Japanese recruited 5,000 volunteers in the Anhui area for the Reorganized National Government Army. Japanese forces and the Reorganized National Government used slogans like "Lay down your guns and take up the plough", "Oppose the Communist Bandits" or "Oppose Corrupt Government and Support the Reformed Government" to dissuade guerrilla attacks and buttress its support.

The Japanese used various methods for subjugating the local populace. Initially, fear was used to maintain order, but this approach was altered following appraisals by Japanese military ideologists. In 1939, the Japanese army attempted some populist policies, including:
land reform by dividing the property of major landowners into small holdings, and allocating them to local peasants;
providing the Chinese with medical services, including vaccination against cholera, typhus, and varicella, and treatments for other diseases;
ordering Japanese soldiers not to violate women or laws;
dropping leaflets from aeroplanes, offering rewards for information (with parlays set up by use of a white surrender flag), the handing over of weapons or other actions beneficial to the Japanese cause. Money and food were often incentives used; and
dispersal of candy, food and toys to children

Buddhist leaders inside the occupied Chinese territories ("Shao-Kung") were also forced to give public speeches and persuade people of the virtues of a Chinese alliance with Japan, including advocating the breaking-off of all relations with Western powers and ideas.

In 1938, a manifesto was launched in Shanghai, reminding the populace the Japanese alliance's track-record in maintaining "moral supremacy" as compared to the often fractious nature of the previous Republican control, and also accusing Generalissimo Chiang Kai-Shek of treason for maintaining the Western alliance.

In support of such efforts, in 1941 Wang Jingwei proposed the Qingxiang Plan to be applied along the lower course of the Yangtze River. A Qingxiang Plan Committee (Qingxiang Weiyuan-hui) was formed with himself as Chairman, and Zhou Fohai and Chen Gongbo (as first and second vice-chairmen respectively). Li Shiqun was made the committee's secretary. Beginning in July 1941, Wang maintained that any areas to which the plan was applied would convert into "model areas of peace, anti-communism, and rebuilders of the country" (heping fangong jianguo mofanqu). It was not a success.

Economy 
The North China Transportation Company and the Central China Railway were established by the former Provisional Government and Reformed Government, which had nationalised private railway and bus companies that operated in their territories, and continued to function providing railway and bus services in the Nanjing regime's territory.

Life under the regime 

Japanese under the regime had greater access to coveted wartime luxuries, and the Japanese enjoyed things like matches, rice, tea, coffee, cigars, foods, and alcoholic drinks, all of which were scarce in Japan proper, but consumer goods became more scarce after Japan entered World War II. In Japanese-occupied Chinese territories the prices of basic necessities rose substantially as Japan's war effort expanded. In Shanghai in 1941, they increased elevenfold.

Daily life was often difficult in the Nanjing Nationalist Government-controlled Republic of China, and grew increasingly so as the war turned against Japan (c. 1943). Local residents resorted to the black market in order to obtain needed items or to influence the ruling establishment. The Kempeitai (Japanese Military Police Corps), Tokubetsu Kōtō Keisatsu (Special Higher Police), collaborationist Chinese police, and Chinese citizens in the service of the Japanese all worked to censor information, monitor any opposition, and torture enemies and dissenters. A "native" secret agency, the Tewu, was created with the aid of Japanese Army "advisors". The Japanese also established prisoner-of-war detention centres, concentration camps, and kamikaze training centres to indoctrinate pilots.

Since Wang's government held authority only over territories under Japanese military occupation, there was a limited amount that officials loyal to Wang could do to ease the suffering of Chinese under Japanese occupation. Wang himself became a focal point of anti-Japanese resistance. He was demonised and branded as an "arch-traitor" in both KMT and Communist rhetoric. Wang and his government were deeply unpopular with the Chinese populace, who regarded them as traitors to both the Chinese state and Han Chinese identity.  Wang's rule was constantly undermined by resistance and sabotage.

The strategy of the local education system was to create a workforce suited for employment in factories and mines, and for manual labor. The Japanese also attempted to introduce their culture and dress to the Chinese. Complaints and agitation called for more meaningful Chinese educational development. Shinto temples and similar cultural centers were built in order to instill Japanese culture and values. These activities came to a halt at the end of the war.

Notable figures 
Local administration:
Wang Jingwei: President and Head of State
Chen Gongbo: President and Head of State after the death of Wang. Also, President of the Legislative Yuan (1940–1944) and Mayor of the Shanghai occupied sector.
Zhou Fohai: Vice President and Finance Minister in the Executive Yuan
Wen Tsungyao: Chief of the Judicial Yuan
Wang Kemin: Internal Affairs Minister, previously head of the Provisional Government of the Republic of China
Liang Hongzhi: Head of the Legislative Yuan (1944–1945), previously head of the Reformed Government
Yin Ju-keng: Member of the Legal Affairs Department, previously head of the East Hebei Autonomous Government
Wang Yitang: Minister of the Examination Yuan, Chairman of the North China Political Council (1940–1943)
Jiang Kanghu: Chief of the Education Yuan
Xia Qifeng: Chief of the Auditing Bureau of the Control Yuan 
Ren Yuandao: Minister of the Navy (1940–1945) & Chairman of the National Military Council (1940–1942)
Xiao Shuxuan: Minister of Military Affairs (1945) & Chairman of the National Military Council (1942–1945)
Yang Kuiyi: Chief of General Staff (1940–1942) & Chairman of the National Military Council (1945)
Bao Wenyue: Minister of Military Affairs (1940–1943) & Chief of General Staff (1943–1945)
Ye Peng: Minister of Military Affairs (1943–1945) & Chief of General Staff (1942)
Xiang Zhizhuang: Commander of the 5th Group Army, Commander of the 12th Army, Governor and Commander of Security in Zhejiang Province, Governor of Jiangsu Province
Rong Zhen: Chief of the Committee for Subjugation Communists, Governor of Hebei Province (1945)
Kou Yingjie: Councilor of the General Staff office 
Liu Yufen: Chief of General Staff (1942–1943)
Hu Yukun: Chief of General Staff (1945)
Hao Pengju: Chief of Staff of the 1st Army group, Governor of Huaihai, General commander of the 6th Route Army
Wu Huawen: Commander in Chief of the 3rd Front Army
Qi Xieyuan: Commander-in-Chief of the North China Appeasement army, Supervisor of the General administration of Justice
Sun Dianying: Commander of the Collaborationist Chinese Army 6th group army district
Ding Mocun: Chief of the Collaborationist Secret police, Minister of Society, Minister of Transport, Governor of Zhejiang province
Li Shiqun: Head of No. 76, the regime's secret service stationed in No. 76 Jessefield Road in Shanghai
Zhu Xingyuan: Chief of the Agency of Political Affairs
Tang Erho: Chairman of the North China Political Affairs Commission
Gu Zhongchen: Vice-Chief of the Examination Yuan (1940–1944), Chief of the Examination Yuan (1944–1945)
Thung Liang Lee: director of the International Publicity Bureau (1940–1945)
Xia Suchu: Executive Vice-chief to the Evaluation Department of the Examination Yuan, Chief Secretary of the Examination Yuan  
Chen Qun: Interior Minister (1940–1943)
Luo Junqiang: Minister of Justice (1942–1943), Governor of Anhui (1943–1944)
Zhao Yusong: Minister of Agriculture (1940–1941), Minister of Justice (1941–1942), Minister of Civil Service (1942–1943)
Mei Siping: Interior Minister (1943–1945)
Su Tiren: Governor of Shanxi (1938–1943), Mayor of Beijing Special city (1943)
Zhao Zhengping: Minister of Education (1940–1941)
Wang Shijing: Executive Member and Governor to the General Office for Finance, Governor of the General Office for Economy
Zhou Huaren: Executive Vice-Minister of Railways, Mayor of Guangzhou Special Municipality
Lin Bosheng: Propaganda Minister (1940–1944)
Zhao Zhuyue: Propaganda Minister (1944–1945)
Gao Guanwu: Mayor of Nanjing Special City (1938–1940), Governor of Jiangsu (1940–1943), Governor of Anhui (1943), Governor of Jiangxi (1943–1945)
Chen Zemin: Governor of Jiangsu Province
Yu Jinhe: Mayor of Beijing Special City (1938–1943)
Lin Biao (born 1889): Chief of the Administrative High Court
Kaya Okinori: Japanese nationalist, merchant, and commercial adviser 
Chu Minyi: Foreign Minister (1940; 1941–1945), ambassador to Japan (1940–1941)
Cai Pei: Mayor of Nanjing Special City (1940–1942), ambassador to Japan (1943–1945)
Xu Liang: Foreign Minister (1940–1941), ambassador to Japan (1941–1943)
Li Shengwu: Foreign Minister (1945), ambassador to Germany
Zhang Renli: Mayor of Tianjin Special City (1943)
Yan Jiachi: Vice-Minister for Finance, Control Officer of the Control Yuan
Xu Xiuzhi: Mayor of Beijing Special City (1945)
Lian Yu: ambassador to Manchukuo (1940–1943), ambassador to Japan (1945)
Zhu Lühe: Vice-Chief of the Judicial Yuan, Chairperson of the Disciplinary Action Committee for Central Public Servants
Wen Shizhen: Mayor of Tianjin Special City (1939–1943)
Wang Xugao: Governor of Jinhaidao, Mayor of Tianjin Special City
Wang Yintai: Governor of the General Office for Business, Governor of the General Office for Agriculture, Chairperson of the North China Political Council
Chen Jicheng: ambassador to Manchukuo (1943–1945)
Wang Xiang (Republic of China politician): Chief of the Agency for Education in Shanxi, Governor and Security Commander of Shanxi
He Peirong: Governor of Hubei province (1938–1942), Commander of Security in Hubei
Ni Daolang: Governor of Anhui Province
Wang Ruikai: Governor of Zhejiang province (1938–1941)
Zhu Qinglai: Minister of Transport, Chairman of the Irrigation Commission, Vice-Chief of the Legislative Yuan
Wu Zanzhou: Governor of Hebei province (1939–1943), President of the Police High School
Shao Wenkai: Governor of Henan province
Wang Mo: Chief of the General Office for Education 
Chao Kung: (Ignaz Trebitsch-Lincoln), purported Buddhist leader
Zhou Longxiang: Diplomat, Chief Secretary of the Executive Yuan, Chief of the Civil Servants.
Zhou Xuechang: Mayor of Nanjing Special City (1941–1945)
Zhu Shen: Executive Member and Chief of the Agency for Political Affairs, Chairperson of the North China Political Council
Yu Baoxuan: Observer to the Commission for High Ranking Officers Examination
Li Fang (diplomat): Foreign minister to Romania and Hungary, Ambassador to Germany
Yin Tong: Governor of the General Office for Construction
Hao Peng (ROC):  Chief Executive of the Suhuai Special Region, Commander of the Suhuai Special Region Security forces
Wu Songgao: Secretary of the Central Political Committee, Vice-Minister for Judicial Administrating, Chairman of the Committee for Baojia system
Yue Kaixian: Chief of the General Office for Business
Deng Zuyu: Governor of Jiangxi province (1943)

Foreign representatives and diplomatic personnel:
Nobuyuki Abe: Japanese ambassador to the Reorganized National Government (1940)
Kumataro Honda: Japanese ambassador (1940–1941)
Mamoru Shigemitsu: Japanese ambassador (1941–1943)
Masayuki Tani: Japanese ambassador (1943–1945)
Teiichi Suzuki: Japanese military and political adviser
Sadaaki Kagesa: Japanese military advisor
Zang Shiyi: Manchukuo ambassador
Li Shaogeng: Manchukuo special envoy
Heinrich Georg Stahmer: German ambassador (1941–1943)
Erich Kordt: German ambassador (1943)
Ernst Woermann: German ambassador (1943–1945)
Francesco Maria Taliani de Marchio: Italian ambassador (1941–1943)
Álvaro de Maldonado y de Liñán: Spanish minister (1941–1943)
José González de Gregorio: Spanish chargé d'affaires (1944–1945)
Hialmar Collin: Danish minister (1941–1945)

Legacy 
Having died before the war had ended, Wang Jingwei was unable to join his fellow Reorganized Nationalist Government leaders on trial for treason in the months that followed the Japanese surrender. Instead he, alongside his presidential successor Chen Gongbo (who was tried and sentenced to death by the victorious Nationalists) and his vice president Zhou Fohai (who had his death sentence commuted to life imprisonment), was given the title Hanjian meaning arch-traitor to the Han people. In the following decades, Wang Jingwei and the entire reputation of the collaborationist government have undergone considerable scholastic debate. In general, evaluations produced by scholars working under the People's Republic of China have held the most critical interpretations of the failed regime, Western scholars typically holding the government and Wang Jingwei especially in a sympathetic light, with Taiwanese scholars falling somewhere in the middle.

In popular culture
 Lust, Caution is a 1979 novella by Chinese author Eileen Chang which was later turned into an award-winning film by Ang Lee. The story is about a group of young university students who attempt to assassinate the Minister of Security of the Reorganized National Government. During the war, Ms. Chang was married to Hu Lancheng, a writer who worked for the Reorganized National Government and the story is believed to be largely based on actual events.
 The 2009 Chinese film The Message is a thriller/mystery in the vein of a number of Agatha Christie novels. The main characters are all codebreakers serving in the Reorganized National Government's military, but one of them is a Kuomintang double-agent. A Japanese intelligence officer detains the group in a castle and attempts to uncover which of them is the spy using psychological and physical coercion, uncovering the protagonists' bitter rivalries, jealousies, and secrets as he does so.

 The TV series Sparrow is a spy genre thriller. During Shanghai's Reorganised Government, communist agent Chen Shen infiltrates the Japanese' base and adopts the code name "Sparrow". His mission is to obtain the "zero" intel, a secret plan that could destroy China. To do so, he becomes the assistant of Bi Zhongliang, the leader of the Special Operations Team under the Public Security Bureau.

See also 
Manchukuo
Great Way Government
Second Sino-Japanese War
History of the Republic of China
National Revolutionary Army
Collaborationist Chinese Army
 Kuomintang-Nanjing
Organization of the China Garrison detachment of the Imperial Japanese Army (to 1937)
Organization of Japanese Expeditionary forces in China
List of East Asian leaders in the Japanese sphere of influence (1931–1945)
List of leaders of the Republic of China

Notes

References

Citations

Sources 

 Journal articles
 
 
 

 Books

External links 

Central China Railway Company Flag, under Japanese Army control
Flags of the Reorganized National Government of the Republic of China
 Slogans, Symbols, and Legitimacy: The Case of Wang Jingwei's Nanjing Regime
Visual cultures of occupation in wartime China

1940 establishments in China
1945 disestablishments in China
China, Reorganized National Government of
Military history of China during World War II
 
Second Sino-Japanese War
Former countries in Chinese history
 
Former republics
States and territories disestablished in 1945
States and territories established in 1940